Tymbira was a torpedo cruiser operated by the Brazilian Navy, belonging to the  along with Tamoio and Tupi. During the First World War it patrolled the Brazilian coast. It was dismissed from service on 30 November 1917.

Construction and design 
Tymbira was built by the Stettin shipyard, in Kiel, Germany, and was launched on 1 April 1896. Its name is a tribute to the Timbiras, a Brazilian indigenous people who inhabited the current territory of the state of Maranhão. It was the first Tupi class torpedo cruiser commissioned in the Brazilian navy. The incorporation took place on 26 January 1896. The ship was built with a maximum displacement of 1,190 tons, 79.35 m in length, 9.40 m in beam, 5 m in depth and 2.97 m in draft. Its propulsion system consisted of two steam engines that generated 7,693 hp of power and propelled the vessel up to 22.5 knots. It was armed with two 101mm Armstrong guns, six 57mm Nordenfelt guns, two 37mm Maxim guns, two 7mm Maxim machine guns and two 452mm torpedo tubes.

Service 
In May 1905, it is recorded that Tymbira sailed to Manaus in formation with other Brazilian vessels. In 1910 it carried out naval exercises in Rio de Janeiro. By the end of 1913, it was with the fleet of the São Sebastião Island Squadron, for naval exercises, formed by the battleships Minas Geraes, São Paulo, Floriano and Deodoro; the cruisers Almirante Barroso, Bahia and Rio Grande do Sul, the torpedo cruisers Tamoio and Tupi, the destroyers Amazonas, Pará, Piauí, Rio Grande do Norte, Alagoas, Paraíba, Sergipe, Paraná, and Santa Catarina. During the First World War, it patrolled the Brazilian coast between the ports of the northern region and Rio de Janeiro. It was decommissioned on 30 November 1917.

References

Citations

Bibliography 

 

1896 ships
1917 disestablishments
Cruisers of the Brazilian Navy